is a Japanese anime television series based on the online game Ixion Saga by Capcom. It began airing on October 6, 2012 and ended on March 30, 2013. It also was adapted into two manga series and a light novel series.

Plot
One day as Kon Hokaze is playing an MMORPG, he receives a request from a female character in the game. He thinks that he has lucked out and found a girlfriend online, but suddenly he finds himself transported into the world of Mira where he accidentally saves a young princess, Ecarlate, by landing on her attacker with his swivel chair. With no idea how he got there nor how to get back to his own world, Kon tags along with the princess as part of her honor guard while a militant faction of the princess's own country seeks to capture her before she can complete her arranged marriage.

Characters
 DT

A hardcore video gamer who gets transported into the world of the game after accepting a request from a female character. He wields the "Alma Gear" sword, which is capable of transforming into a giant hammer with jet boosters. He also gets stuck with the nickname "DT" by accident (short for "dōtei" in Japanese, or slang for a male virgin). Because of his natural control of Alma energy, he is considered to be a Hyperion. He tries to avoid dangerous fights and uses cheap tactics when he feels like he cannot win; something that is the opposite of "ED."

The little princess of St. Piria with a nasty behavior who travels to marry the Prince of a neighboring country and bring peace to both sides.  At certain periods of her growing stage, she appears to have a hyperactive appetite and ferocious behavior that is rarely seen.

A transgender maid who wields pistols akimbo and protects the princess. She admits being jealous of the princess getting married. Occasionally, she will revert to her masculine voice. Later she has Almaflora give her Alma Gear to Erec.

A well-sculpted veteran swordsman who also guards the princess. Graduated at the top of his class from a university, has experience in architecture design and engineering. He also greatly loves cats.

A mysterious lady who is responsible for Kon being transported into the world of the game for reasons unknown. She is an Ixion. She is also responsible for forging the first Alma Gear Sword given to Erec (now in Kon's possession).  She reforges Erec another Alma Gear called the Calibre (based on the Excalibur) and reminds him not to lose another Alma Gear again. She calls herself  "mysterious women" and transported Kon so he can save the world. She later turned Kon's friends and Erec's men to Hyperions .

The leader of a militant faction named "Incognito" that seeks to stop the Princess Ecarlate before she can be wed and bring peace to the land. Swears vengeance on "DT" after getting hit twice in the testicles so hard that a doctor is forced to remove them early on in the series (his name and character is a comedic reference to "ED", or "Erectile Dysfunction."); because he removed his testicles, this had helped him much later as it completely prevented Erecpyle from falling into the trap set by Limpus and Gabriella Dascas, who wanted to revive their family name. He was given Calibre after losing his Alma Gear.  Despite being labeled as the antagonist in the series, he is rather honorable and fights clean, unlike his more opposite, "DT."  At the end of the series he receives Mariandale's testicles.

One of ED's lieutenants, accidentally defeated by Kon's swivel chair.  He is the youngest of the group, despite being a major sadist; admitted himself when trying to go up against Kon's party solo. He's been intrigued with the idea of nudity, shown when he gladly joined Gustave 's plan to distract Kon by nudity and when he stripped into his underwear during Incognito's karaoke vacation. Variation is as well the most normal one in the group; he answered KT by sharing that he  likes a kind girls. He shows distrust with his high rank superiors, the Ulga Sorority. He is very skilled in spying.
KT

Another of ED's lieutenants. KT has a crush on ED and is a raging drunk. The "KT" could stand for "kintama," which is slang for "testicles."It is inferred in the anime that KT is male , when he asked ED if the latter liked guys over girls. In episode 23, it revealed that KT is a girl; though everyone except Erec knew that fact.

Another of ED's lieutenants.  He is extremely sensitive when it comes to his divorce, though he likes lustful things. Gustave also has a thing for hostess bars and would always pick fights with KT for that reason.

Another of ED's lieutenants.  He is a masochist, despite denying it.

A flying squirrel sent by Almaflora that attached itself to Kon's party. Often seen wearing a tiny hat and goggles. Later on, it is revealed that he can talk and is elderly.
Emilia

ED's fiancee.  Her discussions with ED sometimes turn into uncomfortable situations due to ED losing his testicles in battle; something she is unaware of.
Miranda

A delusional woman who causes trouble for her entire village. Kon's party runs into her on the way to the capital, and she temporarily becomes infatuated with Kon.
Lord Nabokov Jugglaburk

Prince of Jugglaburk that is to be wed with Ecarlate for peace. However, he has an alternate agenda. He is actually a rather bizarre manchild with a fetish for dolls and stuffed animals, and had only agreed to marry Ecarlate because she was young and short enough that he could treat her as a living doll.

Anime

DVD Releases

References

External links
 

2012 anime television series debuts
2012 Japanese novels
2013 Japanese television series endings
Action anime and manga
Anime television series based on video games
Brain's Base
Comedy anime and manga
Fantasy anime and manga
Ichijinsha manga
Transgender in anime and manga
Kodansha books
Kodansha manga
Kodansha Ranobe Bunko
Light novels
Manga based on video games
Shōjo manga
Shōnen manga
Television series based on Internet-based works
Works based on Capcom video games